K60 or K-60 may refer to:

 K-60 (Kansas highway), a state highway in Kansas
 Karry K60, a car
 K-60, a variant of the GMC CCKW 2½-ton 6×6 truck